Piggs (Produce Idol Go to world is Good Society), is a Japanese alternative idol girl group that formed in April 2020. They released their debut album, Hallo Piggs, on July 1, 2020.

History

2020–present: Formation and debut with Hallo Piggs
On January 6, 2020, Pour Lui announced that she would produce a new idol group which she would also be a member of. The group was given the temporary name  and the audition process was documented on Pour Lui's YouTube channel. On February 29, auditions were re-opened after an audition winner withdrew from the group. At the beginning of April, during the COVID-19 pandemic, Pour Lui revealed that the group were living together. On April 19, the final line-up was unveiled and their first song, "Kicks", was released on YouTube. Their debut album, Hallo Piggs, was released on July 1. Their first EP, 5 Kill Stars, was released on December 16.

On April 13, 2021, Umi withdrew from the group. Their first single, "T.A.K.O", was released on April 21. They released their second single, "Visitor", on July 21. A new member, Kinchan, joined the group on September 18. Their second studio album, Juicyy, was released on December 22.

On March 30, 2022, they released their third single, . On July 13, the group released their fourth and fifth indie singles,  and "Burning Pride". These were the group's final indie singles as they went on to make their major label debut with  through Ariola Japan on January 11, 2023. They will release the single "Boo!Shut" on April 12.

Members

Current

Former

Discography

Studio albums

Extended plays

Singles

References

Japanese girl groups
Japanese idol groups
Japanese pop music groups
Musical groups from Tokyo
Musical groups established in 2020
2020 establishments in Japan